Braunsberg is a 346 m high limestone massif in Hainburg an der Donau, Austria, on the shore of the Danube. Its plateau used to host a Celtic town, and still bears traces of the Celtic-Roman era.

Mountains of Lower Austria